"Hazumu Rizumu" is a collaborative single between Puffy AmiYumi and Tokyo Ska Paradise Orchestra released on September 20, 2006. The single was marketed as part of Lipton's 100th Anniversary in Japan.

Track listing
 Hazumu Rhythm (words: Puffy/music: Nargo) 4:28
 Hazumu Rhythm [Backing Track](words: Puffy/music: Nargo) 4:26

Chart performance
The single peaked at number 15 on the singles chart, selling 6.220 copies that week, and stayed on the chart for 6 weeks.

References

2006 singles
Puffy AmiYumi songs
2006 songs